Henry Meredith Nelly (January 1, 1878 – December 14, 1928) was an American college football player and coach and United States Army officer. He served as the head football coach at the United States Military Academy from 1908 to 1910, compiling a record of 15–5–2. Nelly was born on January 1, 1878, in West Virginia. He died in 1928.

Head coaching record

References

1878 births
1928 deaths
Army Black Knights football coaches
Army Black Knights football players
United States Army officers
United States Army personnel of World War I
Players of American football from West Virginia